Wayne Carroll (born 16 February 1959) is a retired Australian basketball player. As part of the National Basketball League, Carroll played in 287 games between 1980 to 1990. He competed in the men's tournament at the 1984 Summer Olympics and the 1988 Summer Olympics.

References

External links
 

1959 births
Living people
Australian men's basketball players
1982 FIBA World Championship players
Basketball players at the 1984 Summer Olympics
Basketball players at the 1988 Summer Olympics
Basketball players from Melbourne
Olympic basketball players of Australia
Sportsmen from Victoria (Australia)
1986 FIBA World Championship players